Urbs Legionis or Legionum (Latin for "city of the legion[s]") may refer to:

 Deva Victrix (Roman Chester) in northwest England
 Isca Augusta (Roman Caerleon) in southern Wales

See also
 Eboracum (Roman York), sometimes thought to have been the original referent for some mentions of urbs legionis in Roman sources